Johann Hermann Kufferath (12 May 1797 – 28 July 1864) was a German composer.

Life
Born in Mülheim an der Ruhr, he was the eldest son of watchmaker Carl Kufferath and his wife Catharina née Horst, born in Mülheim an der Ruhr. He and six of his brothers possessed an unusual musical talent, and they were referred to by contemporaries as the "musical Pleiades" (a constellation of seven bright stars).

A pupil of Louis Spohr and Moritz Hauptmann, he was music director in Bielefeld from 1823 and municipal director of music in Utrecht from 1830. He wrote cantatas, overtures, motets and a chant textbook.

Kufferath was married to soprano Elisabeth Sophie Reintjes. He died in Wiesbaden on July 28, 1864.

See also
 Jacques Offenbach

References

 
 Klaus-Ulrich Düwell: "Johann Hermann Kufferath", in: Rheinische Musiker III (Köln, 1964), p. 53 fl.
 C. A. J. Bastiaenen: "De familie Kufferath, een muzikaal geslacht van Europees format" , in: Spiegel der Historie, vol. 2 (1967) no. 10, pp. 613–622.
 J. Oberschelp: Das öffentliche Musikleben der Stadt Bielefeld im 19. Jahrhundert (Bielefeld, 1972), pp. 25 fl.
 Geerten Jan van Dijk: Johann Hermann Kufferath (1797–1864), Muziekdirecteur te Utrecht (Universiteit Utrecht, Faculteit Geesteswetenschappen, Instituut Media- en Cultuurwetenschappen, 2008); Masters thesis.
 Jens Roepstorff: "Die Musikerfamilie Kufferath aus Mülheim an der Ruhr", in: Mülheimer Jahrbuch 2016, pp. 134–139.

External links
 Article about "Die Musikerfamilie Kufferath from Mülheim an der Ruhr. State archives of Mülheim an der Ruhr. (in German)

Further reading
 Duisburger Generalanzeiger, 3 January 1926.
 Stadtarchiv Mülheim an der Ruhr, vol. 1440.

1797 births
1864 deaths
19th-century classical composers
19th-century German composers
19th-century German male musicians
German Romantic composers
German male classical composers
People from Mülheim
Pupils of Louis Spohr
Pupils of Moritz Hauptmann